Paracles lehmanni is a moth of the subfamily Arctiinae first described by Rothschild in 1910. It is found in Colombia.

References

Moths described in 1910
Paracles